James Jean Parks (born November 16, 1968) is an American actor.

Parks was born in Ojai, California. His roles include Texas Ranger Edgar McGraw in From Dusk Till Dawn 2: Texas Blood Money, Kill Bill: Volume 1, Kill Bill: Volume 2, Death Proof and Machete. Earl McGraw, the father of Edgar McGraw, is played by James's real life father, Michael Parks. He portrayed Deputy Gilber in the French horror film Rubber. Parks also acted alongside his father again in Kevin Smith's 2011 horror film, Red State, and appeared in Quentin Tarantino's films Django Unchained (as a tracker) and The Hateful Eight (as O.B. Jackson).

In 2006, Parks played Sheriff Dawes on Bones the Television series season 1 episode 17 "The Skull in the Desert"

In 2008, Parks had a small role on the hit HBO television series True Blood playing Mack Rattray.

Filmography

External links

1968 births
American male film actors
Living people
Male actors from California
People from Ventura County, California